Saphenista ceteora is a species of moth of the family Tortricidae. It is found in Minas Gerais, Brazil.

The wingspan is about 10 mm. The ground colour of the forewings is ochreous creamy, but darker at the costa. The hindwings are brownish.

References

Moths described in 2002
Saphenista